The Diocese of Bomadi is a Roman Catholic diocese located in the city of Bomadi, Delta State in Nigeria.

Territory
The Apostolic Vicariate of Bomadi straddles the Niger River and Niger Delta and includes portions of Delta State and Rivers State.

History
 17 March 1991: Established as Mission “sui iuris” of Bomadi from the dioceses of Port Harcourt and Warri.
 15 December 1996: Promoted as Apostolic Vicariate of Bomadi
 21 September 2017: elevated to Diocese

Special Churches
 Our Lady of the Waters Cathedral, Ughelli

Bishops
 Ecclesiastical Superior of Bomadi 
 Fr. Thomas Vincent Greenan (17 March 1991 – 15 December 1996)
 Vicars Apostolic of Bomadi 
 Bishop Joseph Egerega (3 March 1997 – 4 April 2009)
 Bishop Hyacinth Oroko Egbebo (4 April 2009 – 21 September 2017 see below)
 Bishops of Bomadi
 Hyacinth Oroko Egbebo (see above 21 September 2017 – present)

Auxiliary Bishop
Hyacinth Oroko Egbebo, M.S.P.N. (2007-2009), appointed Vicar Apostolic here

References

 GCatholic.org Information
 Catholic Hierarchy

Roman Catholic dioceses in Nigeria
Christian organizations established in 1991
Roman Catholic dioceses and prelatures established in the 20th century
1991 establishments in Nigeria
Roman Catholic Ecclesiastical Province of Benin City